A self-defense force (SDF) is, in its stricter terms, a defense force composed by the local inhabitants of a territory joint together in order to protect themselves, their territory, their property, or their laws. The term, however, has come to refer to three different subjects in modern times:

 Militia, under the sole and exclusive control of subnational authorities, in comparison to the typical armed forces that report to national authorities, or national guards that report to subnational authorities but may come into national authority in times of crisis.
 Japan Self-Defense Forces (JSDF) established after the end of World War II
 Self-Defense Forces (Rojava cantons), Syria

See also
Ministry of defence